Michel Cougé (born 11 June 1954 in Gorron) is a French retired professional football midfielder.

In 1976, he was part of France's Olympic Football team.

References

External links
Profile

1954 births
Living people
French footballers
Association football midfielders
Stade Lavallois players
Stade Rennais F.C. players
Ligue 1 players
Ligue 2 players
Olympic footballers of France
Footballers at the 1976 Summer Olympics
Mediterranean Games silver medalists for France
Mediterranean Games medalists in football
Competitors at the 1975 Mediterranean Games